William H. R. McMartin (June 10, 1854 - April 23, 1945) born in Ormstown, Quebec, Canada, and served in the California State Assembly for the 43rd district from 1903 to 1905.

References

Members of the California State Legislature
People from Montérégie
1854 births
1945 deaths